Lichido is a 36 proof lychee liqueur made with vodka, cognac, lychee and guava essences, and white peach juice. It is imported from the French city of Cognac.

See also 
List of cocktails
List of liqueurs
List of fruit liqueurs

External links
 Website: Lichido Official Website
 Four Star Review in the Spirit Journal: 
 Top Ten Best New Spirits of 2006:  
 Liquor Snob Review: 
 Martini Lounge Review: 
 Luxist.com: 

Fruit liqueurs
French liqueurs